Bohumila Kapplová (born September 27, 1944) is a former Czechoslovak slalom canoeist who competed in the 1960s and 1970s. She finished eighth in the K-1 event at the 1972 Summer Olympics in Munich.

References
Sports-reference.com profile

1944 births
Canoeists at the 1972 Summer Olympics
Czechoslovak female canoeists
Living people
Olympic canoeists of Czechoslovakia
Medalists at the ICF Canoe Slalom World Championships